Kristian Even Haug (11 December 1906 – 2000) was a Norwegian lawyer and politician.  He served as the County Governor of Troms county from 1953 until his retirement in 1976.

References

1906 births
2000 deaths
County governors of Norway